The Golden Guernsey is a rare breed of dairy goat from Guernsey in the Channel Islands, where it has been known for more than two hundred years.

History 

Golden-coloured goats have been known in Guernsey for some two hundred years; the first documented reference is in a guide book published in 1826. In the nineteenth century these goats were known as "Golden Gessenay", Gessenay being the French name for the Swiss Saanen breed.

During the Second World War when Guernsey was occupied, Miriam Milbourne risked her life to save a small herd of Golden Guernsey goats by hiding them for several years.

In 1965 the Golden Guernsey was exported to Great Britain and the English Golden Guernsey Club, later to become the Golden Guernsey Goat Society, was formed.

The Golden Guernsey is an endangered breed: it was listed by the FAO as "endangered-maintained" in 2007. In 2019 the population numbers reported to DAD-IS were 1381 for the Golden Guernsey and 171 for the British Guernsey; both were listed as "at risk". In 2020 the Golden Guernsey was listed as "minority" on the goat watchlist of the Rare Breeds Survival Trust.

Characteristics 
As its name suggests, the goat is golden in colour, with hues ranging from pale blond to deep bronze. They are smaller and more fine-boned than other British milking goats, and there is great variety in coat length. The males are usually horned, with very splendid horns, very few do not have horns. Example, from one herd, Rayton Herd, from around 200 Golden Guernsey kids born not one has been polled, hornless, male or female. Their personalities have been described as "very docile, very friendly".

The goat is efficient milking livestock for its relatively small size, producing an average yield of 3.16 kilograms of milk per day; this is less than most Swiss goats, but the milk's high butterfat and protein content (3.72% and 2.81%, respectively) Maiden milkers are common, the term refers to nannies that come into milk without being put into kid. The average for Rayton Herd, with 15 nannies, is 4 - 5 pints a day, to put the amount in day to day terms.  That is for a nanny kept on pasture with some supplementary feed.

References

External links 
Golden Guernsey Goat Society

Guernsey
Goat breeds
Dairy goat breeds
Goat breeds originating in the United Kingdom